Magdalena Fernández Ladra (born 10 March 1995) is an Argentine field hockey player and part of the Argentina national team.

She was also the part of the Argentine team that won the 2016 Women's Hockey Junior World Cup after a stunning victory over Netherlands in the finals.

She has three sisters who are also hockey players, one of them, Milagros is also part of the national team.

References

1995 births
Living people
Las Leonas players
Argentine female field hockey players
Female field hockey midfielders
Female field hockey forwards
Field hockey players from Buenos Aires
20th-century Argentine women
21st-century Argentine women